The Ampang and Sri Petaling lines extension is an extension of the Sri Petaling line completed in 2016, extending 17.7 kilometres from Sri Petaling to Putra Heights, Malaysia.

History
Extensions to the LRT Kelana Jaya Line and Ampang and Sri Petaling Lines (formerly known as PUTRA and STAR LRT, respectively) were proposed by the Malaysian government in 2006. The proposal suggested extensions from Kelana Jaya and Sri Petaling to USJ and Puchong, respectively, converging at Putra Heights. The extension is named the "LRT Extension Project" (LEP) and will be part of a RM10 billion plan to expand Kuala Lumpur's public transport network.

The proposed extension included 17.7 km of elevated track to serve 11 new stations and extended the line terminus from Sri Petaling to Putra Heights.

Opening
The initial section of the extension opened on 31 October 2015, with four new stations: Awan Besar, Muhibbah, Alam Sutera and Kinrara BK 5. The fare of the extension was free for one month while passengers had to change trains at Sri Petaling. The second section opened five months later to Bandar Puteri, with intermediate stations at IOI Puchong Jaya, Pusat Bandar Puchong and Taman Perindustrian Puchong.

The final extension, inclusive of the Kelana Jaya line, was completed and opened on 30 June 2016. The new stations along this extension are at Puchong Perdana, Puchong Prima, Putra Heights.

Fare increases are based on the distance traveled on the extension.

Services and rolling stock
For the extension, 50 new sets of six-car light rail vehicles (LRV) were ordered from CRRC Zhuzhou Locomotive Co., Ltd. Eight sets served the initial section from Sri Petaling to Kinrara BK 5. The trains were designed to provide more comfort for commuters. The new trains are equipped with wheelchair compartments, designated priority seating, walkthrough carriages, stainless steel seats, onboard destination displays, an integrated dynamic route map, and CCTV cameras for additional security, providing the line with these features for the first time.

Infrastructure
As part of a green initiative, the extension includes green practices. Energy-efficient lights and rainwater harvesting systems were installed in every station. Windows were designed to allow sunlight into the stations. Construction utilized sustainable materials and recycling practices.

Notes and references

Notes

References

Transport in Malaysia